Gérard Manset (also known as Manset; born 21 August 1945 in Saint-Cloud, Hauts-de-Seine) is a French singer-songwriter, painter, photographer and writer. He is best known for his musical work. Since 1972, the covers of his albums state his name as simply "Manset".

Manset spent his childhood in the suburbs of Paris (Saint-Cloud) and then in the sixteenth arrondissement of Paris. He failed his baccalauréat due to the degree of a failing grade in French.

In 1964, Manset was the recipient of the Concours général, and enrolled in the École Nationale Supérieure des Arts Décoratifs. The Salon d'Automne welcomed Manset in its engraving section in 1966. Manset's work was also shown at the Paris Salon. At the same time Manset approached various French advertising agencies with his drawings, without success, however.

Manset began to play guitar, but was also interested in the drums. He borrowed his sister's piano book, and began learning to play it as well.

In 1978 he released an album, titled 2870, equivalent to an album of Pink Floyd. Which never happened in France and will never happen again.

The mystery that was created around Gérard Manset was born from the rarity of his media appearances, the refusal of the scene (he never gave concert), and, above all, the uncompromising character of his work.

Discography

Albums
1968: Gérard Manset
1970: La mort d'Orion
1972: Long long chemin
1975: Y'a une route
1976: Rien à raconter
1978: 2870
1979: Royaume de Siam
1981: L'atelier du crabe
1981: Le train du soir
1982: Comme un guerrier
1984: Lumières
1985: Prisonnier de l'inutile
1989: Matrice
1991: Revivre
1994: La vallée de la paix
1998: Jadis et naguère
2004: Le langage oublié
2006: Obok
2008: Manitoba ne répond plus
2014: Un oiseau s'est posé
2016: Opération Aphrodite
2018: A bord du Blossom
2022: Le crabe aux pinces d'homme

Compilations
1971: Gérard Manset 1968
1976: Il voyage en solitaire
1982: Comme un guerrier
1988: Man Set
1990: Toutes choses
1992: Entrez dans le rêve
1999: Best Of
1999: Manset
2002: Capitaine courageux
2004: Best Of +
2007: Platinum Collection
2015: Classic 2015 Alternatif best Of
2016: Mansetlandia The Ultimate Artefact

Tribute albums
1996: Various artists: Route Manset
2015: Raphael: Solitude des latitudes

Writings and travel notes
1987 : Royaume de Siam – Éditions Aubier
1987 : Chambres d'Asie – Éditions Aubier
1994 : Wisut kasat – Éditions Les Belles Lettres
1994 : Aqui te espero – Éditions Les Belles Lettres
2000 : 72 heures à Angkor – Éditions Les Belles Lettres
2007 : Les Petites Bottes vertes – Éditions Gallimard
2008 : À la poursuite du Facteur Cheval – Éditions Gallimard
2011 : Visage d'un dieu inca – Éditions Gallimard
2011 : Journées ensoleillées – Éditions Favre
2012 : La terre endormie – Filigranes Editions
2012 : Abbaye de Fontevraud – Éditions Abbaye de Fontevraud
2012 : Bruxelles – Editions Zanpano
2015 : Ephémère-Francofolies 1987 et 2014 – Editions Filigranes
2018 : Cupidon de la nuit – Editions Albin Michel
2019 : Récits barbares – Editions Albin Michel

Joint collective works
2013 : Oh ce sera beau – éditions Zanpano (text and drawings)

Books about Gérard Manset
1995 : Gérard Manset – Celui qui marche devant – Daniel Lesueur, Editions Alternatives
2010 : Manset – Légende de l'Inini – Alexis Omble, Editions Les belles lettres

References

External links 

 Official website

1945 births
Living people
People from Saint-Cloud
French singer-songwriters
20th-century French painters
20th-century French male artists
French male painters
21st-century French painters
21st-century French male artists
French photographers
Officiers of the Ordre des Arts et des Lettres